Jago (sometimes Jaygo; James in English) was a legendary king of the Britons according to Geoffrey of Monmouth.  He was the nephew of Gurgustius, succeeded his cousin Sisillius I to the throne and was succeeded by Sissillius' son Kimarcus. Geoffrey has nothing more to say of him.

References

Legendary British kings